The Ding Jinhao Vandalism scandal was a 2013 scandal revolving around Ding Jinhao, a then 15-year-old Chinese boy who scratched the Chinese characters "Ding Jinhao was here" on an engraving at the Luxor Temple in Egypt.

Media response
On May 24, 2013, a verified Weibo user, Mr. Shen, posted a picture of the vandalised engraving with the letters "Ding Jinhao was here" etched in Chinese at the Luxor Temple in Luxor, Egypt. By the next day, the post had 11,000 comments and 83,000 reposts.

On May 25, 2013, a Chinese netizen unearthed personal information pertaining to Ding Jinhao through the Human flesh search engine and posted it to Weibo. On the same day, the Modern Express reported that Ding's parents publicly apologized on Weibo, and that Ding Jinhao was in tears over the incident.

On May 26, the website of Ding's elementary school was hacked by vigilante netizens and defaced with a pop-up window on the website mimicking Ding Jinhao's vandalism. Ding Jinhao's engraving at the temple site was removed on the same day.

Government response
Hong Lei, spokesperson for the Ministry of Foreign Affairs of the People's Republic of China, responded to the scandal by calling on Chinese citizens travelling abroad to comply with local laws and regulations and to behave in a civil manner.
The China National Tourism Administration also responded to the incident by posting a reminder on its official site imploring Chinese tourists intending to travel to domestic and overseas destinations to behave in a civil manner, and included a list of tips that would help them to do so.

Related law

See also

References

Graffiti and unauthorised signage
2013 in China
2013 in Egypt
Luxor
2013 scandals
Chinese inscriptions